Dagan may refer to:

 Dagan (god), a Semitic fertility god
 Dagan languages

Places 
 Dagan, China, in Fujian's Shunchang County
 Dagan, Iran, a village in Kurdistan Province
 Beth Dagan, two cities in ancient Israel
 Beit Dagan, Israel

People 
 Dagan (bishop), Irish bishop in the early 7th century
 Hanoch Dagan, Israeli lawyer
 Meir Dagan (1945–2016), former director of the Mossad
 Dagan Yivzori (born 1985), Israeli basketball player

See also
 
 Dagon (disambiguation)